The term Vibrating Palm might refer to the following:
Vibrating Palm, the "Touch of Death" Qi attacks.

 One of the five fists oassociated with Li (Lee) Family kung fu.